André Luiz Ramos (born 20 January 1970) is a Brazilian long-distance runner. He competed in the men's marathon at the 2004 Summer Olympics.

References

1970 births
Living people
Athletes (track and field) at the 2004 Summer Olympics
Brazilian male long-distance runners
Brazilian male marathon runners
Olympic athletes of Brazil
Place of birth missing (living people)